This article describes the different variants of the North American T-6 Texan.

BT Series

BT-9
Basic Trainer with 400hp Wright R-975-7 Whirlwind and new canopy. Dangerous stall resulted in a variety of unsuccessful fixes. 42 built.
BT-9A
Armed BT-9 with one cowl gun and one rear flexible gun, and modified canopy. 40 built.
BT-9B
Minor changes from BT-9, unarmed. 117 built. 1 modified as sole BT-9D which was modified as a prototype for BT-14 with new outer wing panels and other alterations.
BT-9C
Wright R-975-7, similar to the BT-9A with minor changes. 66 built
BT-9D
One prototype only, Intermediate step in development of the BT-14.
Y1BT-10
600hp Pratt & Whitney R-1340-41. First aircraft of batch of BT-9C completed as Y1BT-10.
BT-10
Production version of Y1BT-10 - cancelled
BT-14
lengthened all metal fuselage and new canopy, Pratt & Whitney R-985-25, 251 built.
BT-14A
27 BT-14s were re-engined with 400 hp (298 kW) Pratt & Whitney R-985-11.

BC Series

North American BC-1
Basic Combat trainer version initial production version with 600hp R-1340-47 engine, Early examples had round rudder, later examples had square bottom rudder. 177 built
BC-1A
New longer semi-monocoque fuselage, new outer wing panels angled forward slightly, squared-off wingtips and triangular rudder, 93 built. Identifiable from later types by blister fairing between undercarriage.
BC-1B
One BC-1A fitted with an AT-6A wing centre section.
BC-1I
BC-1s converted to instrument trainers, 30 modified
BC-2
Similar to BC-1A and AT-6, modified from NA-36 with details from NA-44, 3 bladed propeller.

AT Series (Texan)

AT-6 Texan
Advanced Trainer - same as BC-1A with minor changes, powered by a 600hp R-1340-47 and armed with forward-firing 0.3in machine gun, nine original started as BC-1As and 85 built.
AT-6A
 Same as AT-6 but with 600hp R-1340-49 and removable wing centre section fuel tanks, 1847 built with 298 transferred to the United States Navy as the SNJ-3. Survivors re-designated T-6A in 1948.
AT-6B
Same as AT-6A but with 600hp R-1340-AN-1 and dorsal gun fitted as standard, 400 built.
AT-6C
Same as AT-6B but with material changes to low-alloy steel and plywood, 2970 built including transfers to the United Kingdom as the Harvard IIA.
AT-6D
Same as AT-6B but with a 24V DC electrical system, 4388 built including transfers to the United States Navy as the SNJ-5 and to the United Kingdom as the Harvard III. Redesignated T-6D in 1948.
XAT-6E
One AT-6D re-engined with a 575hp V-770-9 V-12 inline engine for trials.
AT-6F
Same as AT-6D but with a strengthened airframe and minor modifications, 956 built including transfers to the United States Navy as the SNJ-6, Redesignated T-6F in 1948. Clear fixed rear canopy. Some went to Russia via Lend-Lease.
AT-16
Noorduyn built lend-lease Harvards, 1800 built

A-27
North American A-27
Two-seat attack version of AT-6 with a 785hp R-1820-75 engine and five 0.3in machine guns (two in nose, one on each wing and one dorsal). Designation used for ten aircraft for Thailand impressed into United States Army Air Corps use.

T-6 (Texan)

T-6A
AT-6As re-designated in 1948.
T-6C
AT-6Cs re-designated in 1948 including 68 re-builds with new serial numbers.
T-6D
AT-6D re-designated in 1948 including 35 re-builds with new serial numbers.
T-6F
AT-6F re-designated in 1948.
T-6G
Earlier model AT-6/T-6s re-built between 1949-1953 with improved cockpit layout, increased fuel capacity, steerable tailwheel, updated radios and a 600hp R-1340-AN-1 engine. Identifiable by simplified canopy framing. 2068 modified.
LT-6G
T-6Gs converted for battlefield surveillance and forward air controller duties, 97 modified. Nicknamed Mosquito.
T-6H
T-6Fs converted T-6G standard.
T-6J
Designation claimed to have been used for Canadian-built Harvard Mk 4s, however no proof has ever surfaced that this designation was ever used, and aircraft record cards and markings on aircraft called them Harvard 4s. Supplied to Belgium, France, Italy, Portugal and West Germany, 285 aircraft.
KN-1
A single T-6F damaged in a crash during the Korean War that was rebuilt as a floatplane by the Republic of Korea Navy.
Bacon Super T-6
A single AT-6F converted in 1956 with tricycle gear, bubble canopy and tip tanks; no production followed.

NJ/SNJ Texan
NJ-1
United States Navy specification advanced trainer powered with 550hp Pratt & Whitney R-1340-6. Some re-engined with later versions of R-1340. Similar to BT-9, 40 built.

SNJ-1
Similar to Harvard I but with BC-1 wing center section, metal-covered fuselage and late T-6 type wing, 16 built.
SNJ-2
Same as SNJ-1 but with a R-1340-56 engine and changes to carburetor and oil cooler scoops, 61 built.
SNJ-3
Same as AT-6A, 270 built and 296 transferred from USAAC.
SNJ-3C
SNJ-3 converted as deck landing trainers with tailhook arrester gear, twelve modified.
SNJ-4
Same as AT-6C, 1240 built.
SNJ-4C
SNJ-4s converted as deck landing trainers with tailhook arrester gear.
SNJ-5
AT-6Ds transferred from the USAAC, 1573 aircraft.
SNJ-5C
SNJ-5s converted as deck landing trainers with tailhook arrester gear.
SNJ-6
AT-6Fs transferred from the USAAF, 411 aircraft.
SNJ-7
Early models modified to T-6G standards in 1952.
SNJ-7B
An armed variant of the SNJ-7.
SNJ-8
Order for 240 cancelled.

Harvard

Harvard I
Similar to BC-1 but without rear gun and with a 600hp R-1340-S3H1 engine, 400 aircraft.
Harvard II
Similar to BC-1A, 526 built, again without provision for rear gunner.
Harvard IIA (RAF & Commonwealth)
AT-6C, many with wooden rear fuselages when first delivered.
Harvard IIA (RCAF)
'Armed' Harvard II - Any RCAF Harvard II or IIB fitted with wing guns, rockets or bombs.
Harvard IIB
Noorduyn built Mk.IIs, some to US orders as AT-16s for lend-lease. Transfers back from the USAAF (1800) and 757 built.
Harvard T.T. IIB
Target Tug - 42 aircraft built for the RAF by Noorduyn. Number probably included in II totals.
Harvard IIF
Bombing/gunnery trainer - One-off modified from Mk.II with bomb aimer's blister and AT-6 type cockpit.
Harvard III
AT-6D, 537 aircraft for RAF.

Canadian development of Harvard II paralleling the T-6G, and built by Canadian Car & Foundry, 270 for the RCAF and 285 for USAF. Some publications refer to these as T-6J however the aircraft record cards do not use this designation.
Harvard 4K
Belgian designation for Harvard IIs and IIIs upgraded to roughly Harvard 4 specifications.
Harvard 4KA
Belgian designation for armed variant of 4K.

North American company designations

References
Citations

Bibliography

 Andrade, John M. U.S. Military Aircraft Designations and Serials since 1909, Midland Counties Publications, England, 1979, 
 Davis, Larry. T-6 Texan in action. Aircraft in Action Number 94. Carrollton, TX: Squadron/Signal Publications, 1989. 
 Fletcher, David C. & Doug MacPhail. Harvard! The North American Trainers in Canada, DCF Flying Books, San Josef, BC, Canada, 
 Hagedorn, Dan. North American NA-16/AT-6/SNJ - WarbirdTech Series Volume 11, Specialty Press, USA, 1997, 
 
 "North American AT-6 Texan", USWarplanes.net. Accessed 3 May 2010.

1930s United States military trainer aircraft
World War II trainer aircraft of the United States
T-06 Texan
Lists of aircraft variants